James Michael Holmes (born March 8, 1942) is an American politician. He is a member of the Alabama House of Representatives from the 31st District, serving since 2014. He is a member of the Republican party.

References

Living people
Republican Party members of the Alabama House of Representatives
21st-century American politicians
1942 births